Reginaldo Romero (died 1507) was a Roman Catholic prelate who served as Auxiliary Bishop of Seville (1488–1507) and Tiberias (1488–1507).

Biography
Reginaldo Romero was ordained a priest in the Order of Preachers. On March 17, 1488, he was appointed during the papacy of Pope Innocent VIII as Auxiliary Bishop of Seville and Titular Bishop of Tiberias. In Jul 1488, he was consecrated bishop by Diego Hurtado de Mendoza y Quiñones, Archbishop of Seville. He served as Auxiliary Bishop of Seville until his death in 1507.

References

External links and additional sources
 (for Chronology of Bishops) 
 (for Chronology of Bishops) 
 (for Chronology of Bishops) 
 (for Chronology of Bishops) 

15th-century Roman Catholic bishops in Castile
16th-century Roman Catholic bishops in Spain
Year of birth unknown
1507 deaths
Bishops appointed by Pope Innocent VIII
Dominican bishops